This is the list of Thailand international footballers who are either naturalised or born outside the country before choosing to represent Thailand national football team.

List of players
The following players:
have played at least one game for the full (senior male) Thailand international team; and
were born outside Thailand.

References

Thailand international footballers
Lebanon
international footballers
Association football player non-biographical articles
Thailand
Thai diaspora
Thailand
Football in Thailand